Yokosuka Education System (横須賀市教育情報センター) is the public school system operated by Yokosuka, Kanagawa Prefecture, Japan.

YES operates elementary schools, junior high schools, and high schools.

Schools

Secondary schools

High schools
 Yokosuka Sogo High School

NOTE: Many Yokosuka junior high school students continue at schools operated by the Kanagawa Prefectural Board of Education.

Junior high schools

 Iriyamazu Junior High School
 Ikegami Junior High School
 Iwato Junior High School
 Kamoi Junior High School
 Kinugasa Junior High School
 Kitashitaura Junior High School
 Kugou Junior High School
 Kurihama Junior High School
 Mabori Junior High School
 Nagai Junior High School
 Nagasawa Junior High School
 Nobi Junior High School
 Ohtsu Junior High School
 Oogusu Junior High School
 Oppama Junior High School
 Ooyabe Junior High School
 Sakamoto Junior High School
 Sakuradai Junior High School
 Shinmei Junior High School
 Takatori Junior High School
 Taura Junior High School
 Takeyama Junior High School
 Tokiwa Junior High School
 Uenodai Junior High School
 Uraga Junior High School

Elementary schools
 Akehama Elementary School
 Awata Elementary School
 Bouyou Elementary School
 Fujimi Elementary School
 Funakoshi Elementary School
 Hashirimizu Elementary School
 Hemi Elementary School
 Hirasaku Elementary School
 Ikegami Elementary School
 Iwato Elementary School
 Jouhoku Elementary School
 Kamoi Elementary School
 Kinugasa Elementary School
 Kitashitaura Elementary School
 Kouyou Elementary School
 Kouzaka Elementary School
 Kugou Elementary School
 Kurihama Elementary School
 Mabori Elementary School
 Morisaki Elementary School
 Nagai Elementary School
 Nagaura Elementary School
 Natsushima Elementary School
 Negishi Elementary School
 Nobi Elementary School
 Nobihigashi Elementary School
 Obaradai Elementary School
 Oogusu Elementary School
 Ootsu Elementary School
 Ootsukadai Elementary School
 Ooyabe Elementary School
 Oppama Elementary School
 Sakura Elementary School
 Sawayama Elementary School
 Shinmei Elementary School
 Shioiri Elementary School
 Suwa Elementary School
 Takatori Elementary School
 Takeyama Elementary School
 Tado Elementary School
 Taura Elementary School
 Toshima Elementary School
 Tsukui Elementary School
 Tsurukubo Elementary School
 Uraga Elementary School
 Uragou Elementary School
 Yamazaki Elementary School
 Youkou Elementary School

External links
 Yokosuka Education System

Municipal school systems in Japan
Education in Kanagawa Prefecture
Yokosuka, Kanagawa